Clee Hill Junction was a railway junction in Shropshire, England, where the goods only line from Titterstone Clee Hill joined the Shrewsbury and Hereford Railway, a LNWR/GWR joint line. It was situated 24 chains (about a quarter of a mile) to the north of Ludlow railway station.

The branch line to Clee Hill operated between 1864 and 1962, and ran up to the hill via the villages of Middleton and Bitterley, where a marshalling yard was situated. Two rope inclines, one narrow gauge and one standard gauge, carried stone from the quarries on the Titterstone Clee Hill down to this yard. The standard gauge incline was one of the longest in Great Britain.

References

Further reading

Rail junctions in England
Rail transport in Shropshire
Ludlow
Railway inclines in the United Kingdom